Thomas Carrique (born 26 February 1999) is a French professional footballer who plays as a right-back for Spanish club Celta de Vigo B.

Club career
Carrique joined the FC Girondins de Bordeaux academy in 2015 after years of impressing against them with his local club FC Lourdes. He made his professional debut for Bordeaux in a 3–0 Ligue 1 loss to Strasbourg on 8 December 2017, playing the full 90 minutes.

On 25 July 2021, he joined Spanish Primera División RFEF club Celta B.

Career statistics

Club

References

External links
 
 Girondins Profile
 
 

1999 births
Living people
Sportspeople from Tarbes
French footballers
Association football defenders
Ligue 1 players
Championnat National 2 players
Championnat National 3 players
FC Girondins de Bordeaux players
Primera Federación players
Segunda División B players
UD Logroñés players
CD Calahorra players
Celta de Vigo B players
French expatriate footballers
French expatriate sportspeople in Spain
Expatriate footballers in Spain
Footballers from Occitania (administrative region)